The Victoria's Secret Fashion Show is an annual fashion show sponsored by Victoria's Secret, a brand of lingerie and sleepwear. Victoria's Secret uses the show to promote and market its goods in high-profile settings. The show features some of the world's leading fashion models, such as Victoria's Secret Angels Heidi Klum, Gisele Bündchen, Adriana Lima, Karolina Kurkova, Alessandra Ambrosio, Selita Ebanks, and Izabel Goulart. The Pink section was premiered in this year with Jessica Stam as its brand.

The Victoria's Secret Fashion Show 2006 was recorded in Los Angeles, United States at the Kodak Theatre. The show featured musical performances by Justin Timberlake. Karolina Kurkova was wearing the Victoria's Secret Fantasy Bra : Hearts On Fire Diamond Fantasy Bra worth $6,500,000.

The 11th fashion show featured some of the new Angels and also the returning Angels. There was a special performance by Justin Timberlake, and the show was hosted by Heidi Klum.

Fashion show segments

Segment 1: Femme Fatale

Segment 2: Coquettish Fetish

Segment 3: Come Fly With Me

Segment 4: PINK

Segment 5: Highland Romance

Segment 6: Winter Wonderland of Glacial Goddesses

Finale 
The finale was led by Gisele Bündchen marked as the last ever walk.

Index

External links 

 VSFS 2006 Gallery
 The Victoria's Secret Fashion Show 2006 on YouTube

Victoria's Secret
2006 in fashion